Clogh may refer to:

Clogh, County Antrim, a village in County Antrim, Northern Ireland
Clogh, County Wexford, a village in County Wexford, Ireland
Clogh, County Kilkenny, a village in County Kilkenny, Ireland

See also
Clough (disambiguation)